Prahova Stadium is a football-only stadium in Ploieşti, Romania. It is used mostly for football matches and is the home ground of the reserve and youth teams of football team Astra Ploieşti. The stadium is owned by the Astra Ploieşti president Ioan Niculae.

In the future, the stadium will be renovated according to the UEFA stadium standards up to the third category.

History
The old Romanian champion, Prahova Ploieşti, played at this stadium until its dissolution in 2001.

See also
 List of football stadiums in Romania

References

Football venues in Romania
Sport in Ploiești
FC Astra Giurgiu